The 2015–16 Croatian First Football League (officially known as MAXtv Prva Liga for sponsorship reasons) was the 25th season of the Croatian First Football League, the national championship for men's association football teams in Croatia, since its establishment in 1992. The season began on 10 July 2015 and ended on 14 May 2016.

The league was contested by ten teams and played in a quadruple round robin format, with each team playing every other team four times over 36 rounds. Dinamo Zagreb were the defending champions, having won their tenth consecutive title in 2014–15. At the end of the previous season Zadar were relegated, ending their eight-season spell in top flight. They were replaced by Inter Zaprešić, who returned to the top level after two seasons in the second division.

Teams
On 20 April 2015, Croatian Football Federation announced that the first stage of licensing procedure for 2015–16 season was complete. For the 2015–16 Prva HNL, only six clubs were issued a top level license: Dinamo Zagreb, Hajduk Split, Lokomotiva, Rijeka, Slaven Belupo and NK Zagreb. These clubs were also issued a license for participation in UEFA competitions. In the second stage of licensing, clubs that were not licensed in the first stage appealed the decision. On 20 May 2015, all remaining Prva HNL clubs were granted top level license. Additionally, Istra 1961 and RNK Split obtained a license for UEFA competitions. Only three teams from Druga HNL acquired the top level license: Inter Zaprešić, Sesvete and Hrvatski Dragovoljac.

The following teams participated in the 2015–16 Prva HNL.

Stadia and locations

Personnel and kits

Managerial changes

League table

Results

First round

Second round

Relegation play-offs
At the end of the season, ninth placed Istra 1961 qualified for a two-legged relegation play-off tie against Šibenik, runners-up of the 2015–16 Croatian Second Football League.

First leg

Second leg

2–2 on aggregate. Istra 1961 won 5–4 on penalties.

Statistics

Top scorers

Awards

Annual awards

See also
2015–16 Croatian Football Cup
2015–16 Croatian Second Football League
2015–16 Croatian Third Football League

References

External links
Official website 
Prva HNL at UEFA.com

2015-16
2015–16 in European association football leagues
1